Joseph Commings (New York, 1913 - Maryland, 1992) was an American writer of locked room mysteries.  He wrote a series of soft-core sex novels, but is best known for his locked-room mystery/impossible crime short stories featuring Senator Brooks U. Banner."

Commings began writing in 1947, and was first published in 10-Story Detective magazine in March, 1947.  After three stories, Commings also began writing for Ten Detective Aces.  For some reason, the editors of both magazines thought it would be a good idea to have a different detective.  Commings merely changed the name of Banner to Mayor Thomas Landin, but kept everything else the same.  All stories that were first printed in Ten Detective Aces and that have since been reprinted have changed the name of Landin back to Banner."

By the 1950s, Commings submitted stories to Ellery Queen's Mystery Magazine, but Frederic Dannay (half of the writing/editorial team known as Ellery Queen) didn't like the character of Banner, so Commings was never printed in EQMM.  It wouldn't be until 1957 that Commings would be able to print another Banner story."

In 1957, Commings published stories in an offbeat mystery magazine, Mystery Digest.  It was during this time that Commings would write his best-known story, The X Street Murders.  Commings would continue to be published in Mystery Digest until it went bankrupt, his last story being The Giant's Sword in 1963."

Commings would publish a few stories in The Saint Mystery Magazine until 1968.  Commings would also publish a series of part crime/part sex novels.  Commings attempted to write normal mystery novels, and locked room mystery novels, none of which was published.  It wouldn't be until 1979, in Mike Shayne Mystery Magazine, that Commings would publish another Banner story, cowritten by Edward D. Hoch.  (Commings was a friend of both John Dickson Carr and Edward D. Hoch.)  Commings would continue to publish in MSMM until 1984; he died in 1992.  The last Banner story, The Whispering Gallery, was not published until 2004, in the collection Banner Deadlines, published by Crippen & Landru."

Banner Short Stories
1.  Murder Under Glass

2.  Fingerprint Ghost

3.  The Spectre on The Lake

4.  The Black Friar Murders

5.  The Scarecrow Murders

6.  Death By Black Magic

7.  Ghost in the Gallery

8.  The Invisible Clue

9.  Serenade to a Killer

10. The Female Animal

11. The Bewitched Terrace

12. Through the Looking Glass

13. Three Chamberpots

14. Murderer's Progress

15. A Lady of Quality

16. Castanets, Canaries, and Murder

17. The X Street Murders

18. Open to Danger

19. Hangman's House

20. Betrayal in the Night

21. The Giant's Sword

22. The Last Samurai

23. The Cuban Blonde

24. The Glass Gravestone

25. The Moving Finger

26. Stairway to Nowhere (with Edward D. Hoch)

27. Nobody Loves a Fatman

28. Assassination-Middle East

29. Dressed to Kill

30. Murder of a Mermaid

31. The Fire Dragon Caper

32. The Grand Guignol Caper (also known as The Vampire in the Iron Mask)

33. The Whispering Gallery (first published in Banner Deadlines)

Notes

External links
 Information on Banner Deadlines at Crippen & Landru

1913 births
1992 deaths
American mystery writers
20th-century American novelists
American male novelists
American male short story writers
20th-century American short story writers
20th-century American male writers